Ulica may refer to the following places in Poland:
 Ulica Sezamkowa, Polish version of the children's television series Sesame Street.
 Zielona Ulica, village in Poland.
Places called Ulica (listed in Polish Wikipedia)
 Ulica meant "street" in Polish and other some slavic languages including  transliterated "у́лица" in Russian.

Solar
Ulica is also the name of a major Solar Panel distribution company that imports to Australia.